Dashgin Alamoghlu Iskandarov is the general manager of the production union of the State Oil Company of Azerbaijan Republic (SOCAR).

Biography 
Dashgin Iskandarov was born in Azerbaijan's Shemakhi District in 1965. He did his military service from 1983–1985, and after completing his military service, he entered the department for development and complex mechanization of oil and gas fields of Azerbaijan Institute of Oil and Chemistry named M. Azizbayov (now Azerbaijan State University of Oil and Industry). Upon graduating from the institute in 1991, he was qualified as a mining engineer. He later did a PhD. He is married, and has two children.

Career 
He started his career as oil and gas extraction operator on Deep Offshore Platform-5 of “28 of May” Oil and Gas Extraction Department (OGED) in 1991. He worked in the capacity of operator, engineer, deputy chief and then chief of Primary Gas Preparation and Transportation Facility up to 1999. From 1997–2007, he worked as a technician and then as a production supervisor in Azerbaijan International Operation Company and then in the control center of operations in BP Exploration Caspian Sea Limited company. He was appointed as first Deputy Chief and then Chief of “28 of May” Oil and Gas Extraction Department (OGED) of Azneft Production Union of SOCAR in 2007–2010. Iskandarov worked in the capacity of first Deputy Chief of General Manager of Azneft Production Union in 2010. He has been working as General Manager of Azneft Production Union since 2011.

State awards and orders 
 In 2014 he was awarded with the honorary title of Honored Engineer under the corresponding decree of the President of the Republic of Azerbaijan. 
 On November 7, 2017, he was awarded with the “Labor Order of the 3rd degree” for his merits in the development of oil and gas industry, on the occasion of the production of the two billionth tons of oil from the oil fields in Azerbaijan with industrial methods.

References

Living people
1965 births
Azerbaijani businesspeople